Edward Blake Christmas Piper (1938–1990) was an English painter.

Life and career
Edward Piper was the eldest son of the artist John Piper and his wife Myfanwy. He was educated at Lancing College and later studied under Howard Hodgkin at the Bath Academy of Art in Corsham and later at the Slade School of Art in London.

Piper produced photographs for the Shell County Guides and also undertook graphic design commissions to make a living. He continued on to study figurative art and painting female nudes; he later painted landscapes, in Corsica, Malta, France, Italy and Spain.

A number of Piper's lithographs and screenprints are to be found in the Tate Gallery collection.

Piper's son Luke Piper is also a painter and his younger son Henry Piper is a sculptor.

Edward Piper died in June 1990 of cancer at the age of 51.

Books
 Clayton, Sylvia, Edward Piper. David & Charles, 1991. .
 Perry, Jenny, Edward Piper.

See also
 Piper family

References

External links 
 Messums information
 Lonbersyl Fine Art — art work by Edward Piper

1938 births
1990 deaths
20th-century English painters
Alumni of Bath School of Art and Design
Alumni of the Slade School of Fine Art
Deaths from cancer in England
English male painters
English printmakers
Edward
People educated at Lancing College
20th-century English male artists